The Austrian Figure Skating Championships are a figure skating national championship held annually to determine the national champions of Austria. Skaters compete in the disciplines of men's singles, ladies' singles, pair skating, and ice dancing.

History
The German-Austrian Figure Skating Championships were held until 1895. The first Austrian Figure Skating Championships for men were held in 1898 in Vienna. In 1913, the first Austrian Figure Skating Championships for Ladies were held in Prague.

From 1938 (annexation of Austria into Greater Germany by the Nazi regime) until the end of World War II in 1945, Austria did not exist. "Gau-Championships" ("Ostmark" Championships) were held instead of Austrian Championships from 1938 to 1943. In 1944 and 1945, no championships were held at all.

Senior medalists

Men

Ladies

Pairs

Ice dancing

* "Ostmark" Championships instead of Austrian Championships

Junior medalists

Men

Ladies

Pairs

Ice dancing

References

Sources
 Results 1991 listed in Pirouette, 25. Jahrgang, February 1991
 Results 1992 listed in Pirouette, 26. Jahrgang, February 1992
 Results 1993 listed in Pirouette, 27. Jahrgang, February 1993
 Results 1994 listed in Pirouette, 28. Jahrgang, February 1994
 Results 1996 listed in Pirouette, 30. Jahrgang, February 1996
 Results 1997 listed in Pirouette, 31. Jahrgang, February 1997
 Results 1998 listed in Pirouette, 32. Jahrgang, January 1998
 Results 1999 listed in Pirouette, 33. Jahrgang, January 1999
 Results 2002 listed in Pirouette, 35. Jahrgang, January 2002
 Results 2003 listed in Pirouette, 36. Jahrgang, February 2003
 Results 2004 listed in Pirouette, 37. Jahrgang, January 2004
 Results 2005 listed in Pirouette, 38. Jahrgang, February 2005
 Results 2006 listed in Pirouette, 39. Jahrgang, February 2006
 Results 2007 listed in Eissportmagazin Nr.1, January 2007
 Der Eissport Nummer 10, 21 January 1929
 Der Eissport Nummer 12, 11 February 1929
 Deutscher Eissport, 27 January 1898, Page 99
 Rudolf Kutzer, Eiskunstlauf von A - Z (Wien 1955)

 
Figure skating national championships
Figure skating in Austria
Figure skating